Jason Hall may refer to:

 Jason Hall (writer), comic book writer
 Jason Hall (playwright) (born 1978), Canadian playwright
 Jace Hall (born 1971), film/television/video game producer
 Jason Hall (screenwriter) (born 1972), American screenwriter and former actor
 Jason Hall (American football) (born 1983), American football defensive end